Edmond Jacquelin (30 September 1875 – 29 June 1928) was a French track cyclist. He won the sprint event at the 1900 world track championships in Paris.

References

External links

1875 births
1928 deaths
French male cyclists
UCI Track Cycling World Champions (men)
French track cyclists